Quentin Roosevelt II (November 4, 1919 – December 21, 1948) was the fourth child and youngest son of Theodore "Ted" Roosevelt III and Eleanor Butler Alexander. He was the namesake of his uncle Quentin Roosevelt I, who was killed in action in 1918 during World War I. His elder brothers were World War II veterans Theodore Roosevelt IV and Cornelius Van Schaack Roosevelt III. He was a grandson of President Theodore Roosevelt.

Life
Quentin Roosevelt II was born on November 4, 1919 in Oyster Bay, New York, less than one year since the death of his grandfather, Theodore Roosevelt, the 26th president of the United States.

Roosevelt published a paper through the American Museum of Natural History in 1934, describing a new species of fossil pronghorn that he and a boyhood friend, Joseph W. Burden, had found in a cave in southern Arizona.  He attended Harvard College, where he wrote his senior thesis on some Nakhi (Naxi) manuscripts he had collected while visiting Western China at the border of Tibet. Life magazine published images from his journey, which he made at the age of 19.

Military career
He graduated from Groton School followed by Harvard College in 1941 and soon after joined the Army.

World War II
Roosevelt served in the 1st Infantry Division, alongside his father. He served as an artillery officer in the unit.

In 1942, he was seriously wounded by machine gun fire from a German aircraft but survived, and returned to service within a year.

During the war, he fought in the Battle of Kasserine Pass (February 1943). Roosevelt was among the first wave of soldiers to land at Omaha Beach while his father landed with the first wave at Utah Beach on D-Day.

Roosevelt earned the Silver Star, Purple Heart, and French Croix de Guerre for his war service. He was promoted to Major by the end of war and left active service.

Death
While serving as the Director of the China National Aviation Corporation, he was killed in a plane crash in Hong Kong, on December 21, 1948. He was 29. His C-54 plane crashed on a mountain on Basalt Island, near Sai Kung. All 35 on board were killed instantly. There is no clear record of recovery or disposition of his remains, but they are believed to have been left on Basalt Island.  A memorial gravestone for him is located at his wife's grave in Youngs Cemetery in Oyster Bay, New York.
 A memorial was placed for him on Basalt Island.

Family

On April 12, 1944, he married Frances Blanche Webb, an American Red Cross worker, at Blandford Forum. They had three daughters: Alexandra, Susan, and Anna C. Roosevelt, a noted archaeologist specializing in Amazonia, who won a MacArthur Fellowship. Alexandra married Ronald W. Dworkin. Susan Roosevelt Weld graduated from Harvard University with a JD and PhD, and was married to former Massachusetts Governor William Weld; they had five children: David Minot Weld, Ethel Derby Weld, Mary B. Weld, Quentin Roosevelt Weld, and Frances Wylie Weld.

Military awards
Roosevelt's decorations and awards include:

Works
"Buddhism", Life, Jan 8, 1940

References

External links
Obituary, Time, Monday, January 03, 1949
 Associated Press, "Quentin Roosevelt Killed In Plane Crash" (December 22, 1948) New York Times, p. 8.
Hong Kong's Roosevelt Connection - Basalt Island's Air Crash
 Aviation Safety Network, Accident description, N8342C (accessed 2015-04-05)

1919 births
1948 deaths
People from Oyster Bay (town), New York
Military personnel  from New York (state)
Quentin Roosevelt II
Schuyler family
Harvard College alumni
American people of Dutch descent
Victims of aviation accidents or incidents in Hong Kong
Recipients of the Croix de Guerre 1939–1945 (France)
Recipients of the Silver Star
20th-century American politicians
Groton School alumni
United States Army personnel of World War II
United States Army officers
Victims of aviation accidents or incidents in 1948